This is a list of all cricketers who have played first-class, List A or Twenty20 cricket for Uttar Pradesh cricket team. Seasons given are first and last seasons; the player did not necessarily play in all the intervening seasons. Players in bold have played international cricket.

Last updated at the end of the 2019/20 season.

A
 Tahir Abbas, 2006/07-2008/09
 Arif Husain, 2006/07
 Mohammad Abdul Hai, 1976/77-1978/79
 Deepak Agarwal, 1968/69
 Pankaj Agarwal, 1994/95
 Arif Husain, 2007/08
 Aftab Ahmed, 1952/53-1953/54
 Akhlaq Ahmed, 1973/74-1975/76
 B Ahmed, 1968/69
 Haseen Ahmed, 1971/72-1978/79
 Imtiyaz Ahmed, 2007/08-2015/16
 Sagir Ahmed, 1961/62
 Salim Ahmed, 1987/88
 Suhail Ahmed, 1971/72
 Ajit Singh, 2001/02-2002/03
 J Akhtar, 1969/70
 Arish Alam, 2005/06-2014/15
 Aslam Ali, 1973/74-1978/79
 Fasahat Ali, 1988/89-1990/91
 Hyder Ali, 1963/64-1966/67
 Mushtaq Ali, 1959/60-1972/73
 Syed Mushtaq Ali, 1956/57
 Nasir Ali, 2000/01-2001/02
 Zahid Ali, 2010/11-2011/12
 Khurshid Allam, 1958/59-1961/62
 Zamir Alvi, 1952/53
 Lala Amarnath, 1954/55
 Javed Anwar, 2001/02-2003/04
 Sekhar Anand, 1981/82-1986/87
 Asad Ansari, 1970/71-1975/76
 Mazhar Ansari, 1984/85-1991/92
 Arvind Singh, 1996/97-1999/00
 Himanshu Asnora, 2014/15-2015/16
 Sharad Athawale, 1955/56-1965/66
 Israr Azim, 2015/16

B
 Shivadhar Bajpai, 1996/97-2001/02
 Vanmali Balaji Rao, 1961/62-1962/63
 R Balasundaram, 1950/51-1952/53
 Ashok Bambi, 1975/76-1986/87
 Sunil Banerjee, 1949/50-1952/53
 Shahnawaz Bhaktiyar, 1993/94
 HD Bhandari, 1956/57-1960/61
 Yogendra Bhandari, 1994/95
 Anil Bhanot, 1973/74-1983/84
 Rajdeep Bharadwaj, 1990/91
 Ram Prakash Bharadwaj, 1970/71-1974/75
 Rajendra Bhargawa, 1960/61
 Ajit Bhatia, 1958/59
 TK Bhattacharya, 1978/79-1984/85
 BR Bhaveja, 1960/61-1962/63
 Bhupinder Singh, 1987/88-1994/95
 Brijender Singh, 1996/97-1999/00

C
 KS Chamanlal, 1969/70-1976/77
 Phool Chand, 1953/54
 Utkarsh Chandra, 2002/03-2006/07
 Chandraprakash, 1997/98
 Charanjit Singh, 1982/83
 GC Chaturvedi, 1949/50-1950/51
 Rohit Chaturvedi, 1959/60-1966/67
 Sunil Chaturvedi, 1979/80-1991/92
 Shubham Chaubey, 2015/16
 Shivam Chaudhary, 2014/15
 Surendrapal Singh Chauhan, 1989/90
 Piyush Chawla, 2005/06-2015/16
 Karim Chisty, 1963/64-1974/75
 Amit Chopra, 2011/12
 Nikhil Chopra, 2001/02-2003/04
 Vijay Chopra, 1974/75-1983/84
 Rohit Choudhary, 2009/10-2011/12

D
 Mukul Dagar, 2011/12-2014/15
 Daljit Singh, 1952/53-1954/55
 Vijay Dandekar, 1955/56
 Hasan Dara, 1977/78-1979/80
 MM Das, 1969/70
 TK Das, 1954/55
 Manish Deb, 1953/54
 Nitya Dey, 1971/72-1975/76
 Digvijay Singh, 2010/11-2013/14
 R Divedi, 1971/72
 Satish Dorai, 1994/95-2001/02
 Saurabh Dubey, 2015/16
 Vikram Dutt, 1981/82-1983/84
 Nirmal Dutta, 1959/60-1961/62
 BK Dwarkanath, 1949/50
 Eklavya Dwivedi, 2006/07-2015/16

E
 Rahat Elahi, 2002/03-2008/09

G
 KBL Gaur, 1950/51-1953/54
 Amrish Gautam, 1989/90-1994/95
 Aman Gera, 1994/95-1996/97
 S Ghosh, 1969/70
 Ashok Gupta, 1959/60-1960/61
 Gaurav Shukla, 2018-2020
 Praveen Gupta, 2002/03-2013/14
 Vijay Gupta, 1959/60
 Vinod Gupta, 1962/63-1966/67

H
 Masood Halim, 1962/63-1972/73
 Rajinder Hans, 1976/77-1986/87
 Hament Hardikar, 1973/74-1979/80
 Taqi Hasan, 1965/66
 Awies Hashmi, 1968/69-1969/70
 Laxmi Hazaria, 1959/60-1972/73
 Hashmat Hussain, 1986/87

I
 Indrapal Singh, 1987/88-1992/93

J
 Asif Jaffer, 1997/98
 NP Jagdishan, 1961/62
 Sanjeev Jakhmola, 1997/98-1998/99
 Jasbir Singh, 1992/93-1995/96
 Jasbir Singh, 1968/69-1976/77
 Mohammad Javed, 2015/16
 Kasim Jeeva, 1952/53-1956/57
 Subhash Jhanji, 1955/56-1963/64
 Kamal Juneja, 1970/71-1980/81

K
 Mohammad Kaif, 1997/98-2013/14
 Kishan Kala, 1982/83-1985/86
 Obaid Kamal, 1990/91-1999/00
 Kamal Kanojia, 1996/97-1999/00
 Anshul Kapoor, 2002/03-2008/09
 Arvind Kapoor, 1992/93-1993/94
 Neeru Kapoor, 1964/65-1970/71
 Satishchandra Kesherwani, 1988/89-1996/97
 Majid Khalil, 1993/94-1995/96
 Abid Khan, 2007/08-2009/10
 Ahsan Khan, 1981/82
 Farhad Khan, 1968/69
 Amir Khan, 1968/69
 Amir Khan, 2004/05-2013/14
 Ilyas Khan, 1989/90-1990/91
 Iqbal Ahmed Khan, 1949/50
 Kamran Khan, 2010/11
 Mehboodullah Khan, 1971/72-1972/73
 Mustafa Khan, 1978/79-1980/81
 Rafiullah Khan, 1968/69-1980/81
 Sarfaraz Khan, 2015/16
 Yusuf Ali Khan, 1982/83-1985/86
 Shashikant Khandkar, 1979/80-1993/94
 Balbir Khanna, 1949/50-1953/54
 Ravi Kichlu, 1954/55-1955/56
 Krirendra Singh, 1951/52
 Yajuvendra Krishanatry, ?/?
 R Krishnamurthy, 1955/56-1957/58
 Kukreja, 1951/52
 OP Kukreja, 1958/59
 Akhil Kumar, 2002/03
 Bhuvneshwar Kumar, 2007/08-2015/16
 Manu Kumar, 1996/97
 Praveen Kumar, 2004/05-2015/16
 Saurabh Kumar, 2015/16

L
 Riazul Latif, 1956/57

M
 Ghauri Majid, 1969/70-1976/77
 S Malhotra, 2000/01
 Prashant Malviya, 2001/02-2008/09
 Manchandra, 1960/61
 Ashwani Mandhani, 2005/06
 Vijay Manjrekar, 1957/58
 Manoj Singh, 1995/96-1999/00
 R Marwha, 1957/58-1958/59
 Anil Mathur, 1976/77-1985/86
 Gopal Mathur, 1952/53-1960/61
 Servosh Mehrotra, 1980/81-1990/91
 V Mehta, 1961/62
 Arun Mishra, 1955/56-1965/66
 Amit Mishra, 2012/13-2015/16
 Rajneesh Mishra, 1999/00-2007/08
 MN Misra, 1953/54
 R Misra, 1954/55
 Virendra Modi, 1957/58
 B Mohammad, 1968/69-1970/71
 Ananda Mohan, 1950/51-1951/52
 Rajesh Mohan, 1976/77
 Ram Mohan, 1956/57
 Vishwa Mohan, 1954/55
 Mohinder Singh, 1955/56
 Ahmed Mohsin, 1965/66-1966/67
 V Moitra, 1954/55
 Moolchand, 1969/70
 Manoj Mudgal, 1992/93-2001/02
 Ali Murtaza, 2005/06-2015/16
 Ghulam Murtaza, 1962/63-1972/73
 KVR Murthy, 1961/62-1966/67

N
 S Nagaswamy, 1963/64
 Najamuddin, 1952/53
 Mohammad Nasim, 1963/64
 Akshdeep Nath, 2010/11-2015/16
 Dinesh Nautiyal, 1960/61-1973/74
 C. K. Nayudu, 1956/57
 C. N. Nayudu, 1956/57
 C. S. Nayudu, 1956/57-1958/59
 S. S. Nayudu, 1956/57-1958/59

O
 Obaidullah, 1952/53
 Sandir Om Prakash, 1949/50-1950/51

P
 R Pal, 1968/69
 Rajabahadur Pal, 2012/13
 Rambabu Pal, 1990/91-1996/97
 Vinod Pande, 1991/92
 Arun Pandey, 2000/01
 Prashant Mishra, 2000/06
 Gyanendra Pandey, 1988/89-2006/07
 Mukesh Pandey, 1986/87
 Parvinder Singh, 1999/00-2014/15
 Peter Paul, 1969/70
 Dhiraj Pradhan, 1996/97
 K Prakash, 1965/66
 Amba Prasad, 1999/00
 Premsagar, 1962/63-1964/65
 A Puri, 1986/87
 Dev Puri, 1952/53
 SN Puri, 1965/66

Q
 Asad Qasim, 1964/65-1975/76

R
 Arif Rabbani, 1954/55
 Suresh Raina, 2002/03-2015/16
 Ankit Rajpoot, 2012/13-2015/16
 Bhurke Ramchandra, 1950/51
 Pratap Rana, 1987/88-1988/89
 Rahul Rawat, 2013/14
 Abbas Raza, 2006/07
 Musi Raza, 1997/98-2000/01
 Mohsin Raza, 1987/88-1988/89
 Agha Razvi, 1955/56-1959/60
 Rinku Singh, 2013/14-2015/16

S
 M Sadiq, 1960/61
 Mohammad Saif, 1997/98-2005/06
 Mohammad Saif, 2014/15-2015/16
 Samarth Singh, 2015/16
 Sanjay Singh, 1986/87-1987/88
 N Sanyal, 1954/55-1955/56
 Rahul Sapru, 1982/83-1998/99
 SK Satpathy, 1962/63-1964/65
 Subodh Saxena, 1976/77
 P Sen, 1953/54-1957/58
 Shailendra Sengar, 2007/08-2008/09
 Balendu Shah, 1953/54-1954/55
 Mohammad Shahid, 1966/67-1980/81
 Rizwan Shamshad, 1990/91-2006/07
 S Shanmugam, 1964/65
 Sharfuddin, 1969/70-1975/76
 Ashu Sharma, 2000/01-2001/02
 Gopal Sharma, 1978/79-1993/94
 Kishore Sharma, 1984/85-1987/88
 Naman Sharma, 2009/10
 Rakesh Sharma, 1996/97-1998/99
 Rakesh Sharma, 1983/84
 Ramesh Sharma, 1977/78
 Ramgopal Sharma, 1973/74
 Rohit Sharma, 1989/90
 Subash Sharma, 1981/82-1982/83
 Umang Sharma, 2012/13-2015/16
 Almas Shaukat, 2015/16
 Shivasankar, 1952/53-1953/54
 Anand Shukla, 1959/60-1977/78
 Mahendra Shukla, 1948/49-1950/51
 Ravikant Shukla, 2004/05-2011/12
 Saurabh Shukla, 1992/93-2002/03
 Shivakant Shukla, 2003/04-2010/11
 Simant Singh, 1998/99
 Simran Singh, 1952/53-1955/56
 R. P. Singh, 1982/83-1995/96
 R. P. Singh, 2003/04-2014/15
 Ranji Sinha, 1949/50-1952/53
 Vishwajit Sinha, 1981/82
 Arvind Solanki, 1999/00-2001/02
 Somanan Singh, 1951/52
 Rohit Prakash Srivastava, 2000/01-2011/12
 Shashikant Srivastava, 1970/71-1980/81
 Shalabh Srivastava, 1999/00-2010/11
 Tanmay Srivastava, 2006/07-2015/16
 Sureshnagar, 1966/67

T
 MC Taluqdar, 1950/51
 Mohammad Tarif, 1964/65-1966/67
 Kannhiya Tejwani, 1986/87-1988/89
 Bhalchandra Telang, 1949/50-1951/52
 Ankit Tiwari, 2012/13
 Krishna Tiwari, 1955/56-1966/67
 Pankaj Tiwari, 1997/98-2000/01
 RK Tiwari, 1949/50-1953/54
 Vijay Tiwari, 1960/61-1962/63
 Gaurav Tomar, 2012/13-2014/15
 Mritunjay Tripathi, 1999/00-2003/04
 Tulshidhar, 1957/58
 Akhil Tyagi, 1998/99-1999/00
 Sudeep Tyagi, 2007/08-2012/13

V
 Vaidyanathan, 1974/75
 Vipin Vats, 1985/86-1992/93
 Venkatesh Singh, 1960/61
 Aman Verma, 2003/04
 Akash Verma, 2014/15
 Lalit Verma, 2003/04
 Naresh Vig, 1968/69
 Vishwajit Singh, 1996/97-1997/98
 Sheel Vohra, 1965/66

W
 Mohammad Wahidullah, 1949/50-1951/52
 Arshad Waliullah, 1958/59-1973/74

Y
 Avinash Yadav, 2005/06-2006/07
 Ashish Yadav, 2007/08-2010/11
 Jyoti Yadav, 1994/95-2006/07
 Kuldeep Yadav, 2013/14-2015/16
 Pradeep Yadav, 1997/98-1999/00
 Ranjit Yadav, 1994/95-1996/97
 Satyendra Yadav, 1994/95-1995/96
 Upendra Yadav, 2013/14
 Vishal Yadav, 1986/87-1991/92
 Khalid Yusuf, 1964/65

Z
 Ali Zaidi, 2002/03-2006/07
 Ashish Zaidi, 1988/89-2006/07
 Devindra Zinda, 1986/87

References

Abhipreet awasthi

Uttar Pradesh cricketers

cricketers
[[Category:Bowling all-rounder]